Uhambo may refer to:

 HVTN 702, a clinical trial for an investigational HIV vaccine
 Uhambo, a 2016 album by Deborah Fraser